Gamli Garður (lit. Old Dormitory) is a dormitory at Iceland's Háskóli Íslands (University of Iceland), first opened in 1934. It is Iceland's oldest residence hall and the oldest building still standing on campus. International scholarship recipients reside at the dormitory for the duration of their stay. The dormitory was originally employed to house Icelandic students exclusively and currently serves as a hotel during the summer. It contains 43 single  rooms.

References

External links 
 Description of the residence hall at the student housing web page
 Map of the University area in Google Earth and in Google Maps
 Online portal of the University of Iceland in English

University of Iceland
Residential buildings in Iceland